The central Kashmir vole (Alticola montosa) is a species of rodent in the family Cricetidae.
It is found only in India and Pakistan.

References

Alticola
Rodents of India
Rodents of Pakistan
Mammals described in 1894
Taxonomy articles created by Polbot